Dreiklang may refer to:
Triad (music), a three note chord
Klang (music), a concept in Riemannian and Schenkerian theories
Der Dreiklang, Schenkerian journal
Triad (film), a 1938 German film